This is a list of states and union territories of India by Punjabi speakers as of the 2011 census.

List

See also
States of India by urban population
States of India by size of economy

Notes

References

Punjabi speakers
Punjabi language
Punjabi language-related lists